The 2019 South Korean by-elections was held in South Korea on 3 April 2019. 2 seats to the National Assembly of South Korea were contested.

Reasons for by-elections 
The following Members of National Assembly lost or resigned from their seats:
 South Gyeongsang Changwon Seongsan District: Roh Hoe-chan (Justice), due to Roh's death. 
 South Gyeongsang Tongyeong-Goseong District: Lee Gun-hyeon (Liberty Korea), due to Lee's violation of the Political Funds Act.

Results

Seat control

Changwon Seongsan

Tongyeong-Goseong

References 

2019
2019 elections in South Korea
April 2019 events in South Korea